The Standard Geographical Classification (SGC) is a system maintained by Statistics Canada for categorizing and enumerating the census geographic units of Canada.   Each geographic area receives a unique numeric code ranging from one to seven digits, which extend telescopically to refer to increasingly small areas.  This geocode is roughly analogous to the ONS coding system in use in the United Kingdom.

Regions

: Atlantic Canada
: Quebec
: Ontario
: Prairies
: British Columbia
: Northern Canada

Provinces and Territories
X is the above regional prefix, and Y is a further identifier incrementing from east to west.  Taken as a single digit, each value of Y is unique within the province group, or unique within the territory group.

: Newfoundland and Labrador
: Prince Edward Island
: Nova Scotia
: New Brunswick
: Quebec
: Ontario
: Manitoba
: Saskatchewan
: Alberta
: British Columbia
: Yukon
: Northwest Territories
: Nunavut

Census divisions
Census divisions are generally numbered from east to west. In some locations, a similar policy to American FIPS county codes has been adopted, with even-numbered slots being left vacant for future expansion.

Examples:
: Division No. 4, Newfoundland and Labrador
: Division No. 5, Newfoundland and Labrador
: Kent County, New Brunswick
: Northumberland County, New Brunswick
: York County, New Brunswick
: Les Moulins Regional County Municipality, Quebec
: Territoire équivalent of Laval, Quebec
: Territoire équivalent of Montreal, Quebec
: Roussillon Regional County Municipality, Quebec
: Les Jardins-de-Napierville Regional County Municipality, Quebec
: Leeds and Grenville United Counties, Ontario
: [vacant slot]
: Lanark County, Ontario
: Frontenac Census Division, Ontario
: Division No. 4, Saskatchewan
: Division No. 5, Alberta
: Regional District of East Kootenay, British Columbia
: [vacant slot]
: Regional District of Central Kootenay, British Columbia
: [vacant slot]
: Regional District of Kootenay Boundary, British Columbia

Census subdivisions
Census subdivisions are again generally numbered from east to west, and the practice has been to leave even-numbered slots vacant for future expansion.

Examples:
: Tyendinaga, Ontario
: Deseronto, Ontario
: [vacant slot]
: Tyendinaga Mohawk Territory, Ontario
: Belleville, Ontario
: [vacant slot]
: Sanikiluaq, Nunavut
: [vacant slot]
: Iqaluit, Nunavut
: [vacant slot]
: Kimmirut, Nunavut
: [vacant slot]

External links
Statistics Canada 2006 Census Dictionary - Geographic code
 Standard Geographical Classification

Statistics Canada
Geocodes